Peter Mathews (born 12 June 1951 in Canberra, Australia) is an Australian archaeologist, epigrapher, and Mayanist.

He was a professor at the University of Calgary, and is Co Director of the Naachtun Archaeology Project. Between 1979 and 1986 he taught in the Department of Anthropology at Harvard University. He was a professor of Archaeology and Maya Hieroglyphs at La Trobe University until his retirement at the end of 2011. He continued to lecture at the university throughout 2012, until his end of tenure in 2013.

He graduated with a B.A. in 1975 from the University of Calgary where he studied with David H. Kelley, and Yale University with a MPhil, and PhD, where he studied with Michael D. Coe. During his time at Yale he was a MacArthur Fellow, at the age of 33.

In the 1960s, he dubbed artifacts to be from an unknown "Site Q", which some think is La Corona. In 1973, he was invited to the first Mesa Redonda, Palenque conference.

In 1997, he and ten Mexican colleagues were attacked, held, and released, near the Maya site of El Cayo.

Awards
 1984 MacArthur Fellows Program
 2002 Fellow of the Academy of the Humanities in Australia

Works

"MAYA HIEROGLYPH DICTIONARY", FAMSI
Foster, Lynn V., Mathews, Peter, Handbook to life in the ancient Maya world, Oxford University Press US, 2005,

References

External links
"Doyenne of Mayanists", Archeology, Tom Gidwitz, Volume 55 Number 3, May/June 2002
"Time Line of Decipherment", NOVA: Cracking the Code
"My Maya Crash Course", The New York Times, JOHN NOBLE WILFORD, 16 May 2006
"Stones, Bones, Tribes & Scribes", Department of Anthropology, Cleveland State University, Fall 2004, Barbara Grale, Editor

1951 births
Living people
MacArthur Fellows
Yale University alumni
Academic staff of the University of Calgary
Academic staff of La Trobe University
People from Canberra
Australian archaeologists
Australian Mesoamericanists
20th-century Mesoamericanists
21st-century Mesoamericanists
Mayanists
Mesoamerican epigraphers
University of Calgary alumni